Glaucium (horned poppy) is a genus of about 25 species of annual, biennial or perennial herbaceous flowering plants in the family Papaveraceae, native to Europe, north Africa, and southwest and central Asia. The species commonly occur in saline habitats, including coasts and salt pans.

List of species

Glaucium acutidentatum
Glaucium afghanicum
Glaucium alakirensis
Glaucium aleppicum
Glaucium arabicum
Glaucium calycinum
Glaucium cappadocicum
Glaucium contortuplicatum
Glaucium corniculatum, sea poppy
Glaucium cuneatum
Glaucium elbursium
Glaucium elegans
Glaucium fimbrilligerum
Glaucium flavum, yellow horned poppy
Glaucium grandiflorum, grand-flowered horned poppy
Glaucium insigne
Glaucium leiocarpum
Glaucium mathiolifolium
Glaucium oxylobum
Glaucium quadratifolium
Glaucium refractocarpum
Glaucium secmenii
Glaucium squamigerum
Glaucium vitellinum
Glaucium yazdianum

References

Papaveroideae
Papaveraceae genera
Taxa named by Philip Miller